Laura Anne Kalpakian (born June 28, 1945) is an American author. She has also published under the pen names Juliet Fitzgerald and Carenna Jane Greye. She is known for her work in the memoir genre.

Life and career
Kalpakian was born in Long Beach, California, the daughter of Peggy (Kalpakian), a secretary, and William Johnson, a technical representative. She grew up in southern California. She earned her undergraduate degree from University of California, Riverside in 1967. After starting her career as a social worker, she earned a master's degree from the University of Delaware in 1970. She earned a Ph.D. in literature from the University of California, San Diego in 1977.

She has received funding from the National Endowment of the Arts and has won a Pushcart Prize, the Pacific Northwest Booksellers Association Award, and the first Anahid Literary Award for an American writer of Armenian descent.

Her sons are composer Bear McCreary and singer/musician Brendan McCreary.

Selected works
As Laura Kalpakian
The Great Pretenders (Penguin Group, 2019),  
American Cookery (St. Martin's Griffin, 2007)
The Memoir Club (St. Martin's Griffin, 2005)
Educating Waverly (William Morrow, 2002)
The Delinquent Virgin (Graywolf Press, 1999)
Steps and Exes: a novel of family (Bard, 1999)
Caveat (John F. Blair, 1998)
Cosette: the sequel to Les Misérables (HarperCollins, 1995)
Graced Land (Grove Weidenfeld, 1992)
Dark Continent and Other Stories (Viking, 1989)
Crescendo (Random House, 1987)
The Swallow Inheritance (Headline, 1987)
Fair Augusto and Other Stories (Graywolf Press, 1986)
These Latter Days (Times Books, 1985)
Beggars and Choosers (Little, Brown, 1978)

As Juliet Jackson
Belle Haven (Viking, 1990)
As Carenna Jane Greye
Tiger Hill (Piatkus Books, 1985)

References

External links
Laura A. Kalpakian Papers, ca. 1980- via Online Archive of California

Living people
1945 births
American social workers
American memoirists
American women memoirists
American writers of Armenian descent
20th-century American women writers
21st-century American women writers
Writers from Long Beach, California
University of California, Riverside alumni
University of Delaware alumni
University of California, San Diego alumni
20th-century American non-fiction writers
21st-century American non-fiction writers
20th-century pseudonymous writers
Pseudonymous women writers